Val d'Oingt (literally Valley of Oingt) is a commune located in the department of Rhône in the Auvergne-Rhône-Alpes region, in eastern France, established on 1 January 2017 by the merger of former communes of Le Bois-d'Oingt, Oingt and Saint-Laurent-d'Oingt.

See also
 Communes of the Rhône department

References

Communes of Rhône (department)